The first heats of the Women's 100 m Butterfly took place on the morning of Sunday, 26 July. The semi-final took place in the evening session of 26 July and the final took place on the evening of 27 July at the Foro Italico in Rome, Italy. In the final, 7 of the 8 swimmers finished within the same second, and 5 within the same 0.1 of a second.

Records
Prior to this competition, the existing world and competition records were as follows:

The following records were established during the competition:

Results

Heats

Key: CR = Championship record, NR = National record

Semifinals

Swim-off

Finals

Note: The Dutch Record in this event is Inge de Bruijn's  former World Record (56.61), which may help to explain why Veldhuis was the only finalist not to set a National Record (NR).

External links
Heats Results
Semifinals Results
Swim-off Results
Finals Results

Butterfly Women's 100 m
Women's 100 metre butterfly
2009 in women's swimming